Stadion Zagłębia Lubin (Zagłębie Lubin Stadium) was a football stadium in Lubin, Poland. It was the home ground of Zagłębie Lubin until Municipal Stadium opened in 2009. The stadium held 32,430 people and opened in 1985.

The stadium hosted two Poland national football team games. The first was a 2–0 win against the East Germany national football team on August 19, 1987. The second was a 1–1 draw against the Soviet Union national football team on August 23, 1989.

External links
 Stadium picture

Defunct football venues in Poland
Sports venues in Lower Silesian Voivodeship
Lubin County